Penicillium kananaskense is an anamorph species of the genus of Penicillium which was isolated from soil of a forest in Alberta in Canada.

References

kananaskense
Fungi described in 1994